Latin American Politics and Society is a quarterly peer-reviewed academic journal of Latin American studies. It is published by Cambridge University Press on behalf of the Center for Latin American Studies of the University of Miami and the editor-in-chief is Alfred P. Montero (Carleton College).

History
The journal was established in 1959 as the Journal of Inter-American Studies. In 1970, the journal changed its title to the Journal of Interamerican Studies and World Affairs, obtaining its current name in 2001.

Abstracting and indexing
The journal is abstracted and indexed in:

According to the Journal Citation Reports, the journal has a 2020 impact factor of 1.255.

References

External links

Publications established in 1959
Latin American studies journals
Cambridge University Press academic journals
English-language journals
Quarterly journals